The surname Rahimpour may refer to:
 Hassan Rahimpour Azghadi, an Iranian politician
 Siamak Rahimpour, an Iranian soccer player